Fannie Flagg (born Patricia Neal; September 21, 1944) is an American actress, comedian and author. She is best known as a semi-regular panelist on the 1973–1982 versions of the game show Match Game and for the 1987 novel Fried Green Tomatoes at the Whistle Stop Cafe, which was adapted into the 1991 motion picture Fried Green Tomatoes. She was nominated for an Academy Award for the screenplay adaptation. Flagg lives in California and Alabama.

Early life
Born Patricia Neal in Birmingham, Alabama, Flagg is the only child of Marion Leona (née LeGore) and William Hurbert Neal Jr. Aside from a brief period on the Gulf Coast near the town of Point Clear, Flagg spent her childhood in the Birmingham area.

Encouraged by her father, Flagg became interested in writing and performing at an early age, writing her first stage play when she was only 10 years old. As a teen, she entered the Miss Alabama pageant, where she won a scholarship to a local acting school for one year. After that, Flagg began co-hosting a locally produced "Morning Show" on WBRC-TV in Birmingham, but when she was denied a raise, she quit her job and decided to move to New York City.

As her acting career began, Flagg could not use her birth name professionally, as there was already a well-known actress named Patricia Neal registered with Actors' Equity. Having only an hour to choose a stage name, she selected the first name "Fannie" at the suggestion of her grandfather, who recalled it being used by many comediennes in the vaudeville circuit, and "Flagg" at the suggestion of a friend.

Career

Writing
During the 1960s, Flagg began writing skits for the New York nightclub Upstairs at the Downstairs. When one of the performers got sick, Flagg went on in her place and caught the attention of Candid Camera creator Allen Funt, who happened to be in the audience that night. Soon after, Flagg was invited to be a staff writer on his show and later became a performer as well.

In 1978, Flagg won first place in fiction for a short story that she had written at the Santa Barbara Writer's Conference. The work became the basis for the novel Coming Attractions which was published in 1981 following the deaths of her father and mother. The book was reissued in 1992 under the title Flagg originally wanted to use, Daisy Fay and the Miracle Man. The autobiographical coming-of-age novel is written as a diary that starts in 1952 with an 11-year-old protagonist, Daisy Fay Harper. Daisy uses diary entries to tell the story of her alcoholic father's get-rich-quick schemes and her well-mannered mother. The book stayed on The New York Times bestseller list for 10 weeks.

Perhaps her best-known novel, Fried Green Tomatoes at the Whistle Stop Cafe was published in 1987 and remained on The New York Times bestseller list for 36 weeks. It was praised by both Harper Lee and Eudora Welty. The novel is told in both past and present tense by the characters Ninny Threadgoode (past) and Evelyn Couch (present) and focuses on the town of Whistle Stop, Alabama, circa the 1920s and 1930s. It is about the unlikely bonds forged between women who seemingly have nothing in common except restlessness. Flagg subsequently co-wrote the screenplay based on that book, which became the 1991 film Fried Green Tomatoes. The movie garnered her a nomination for an Academy Award. Fried Green Tomatoes starred Jessica Tandy, Kathy Bates, Mary Stuart Masterson, Mary-Louise Parker and Cicely Tyson.

She has also written Fannie Flagg's Original Whistle-Stop Café Cookbook (1993), Welcome to the World, Baby Girl! (1998), Standing in the Rainbow (2002), A Redbird Christmas (2004), Can't Wait to Get to Heaven (2006), I Still Dream About You (2010), The All-Girl Filling Station's Last Reunion (2013) and The Whole Town's Talking (2016). Her latest book, The Wonder Boy of Whistle Stop, was published in October 2020, and includes characters from Fried Green Tomatoes at the Whistle Stop Cafe.

Acting
During the 1970s, Flagg was a fixture on game show panels. She is best known for her appearances on the game show Match Game (normally occupying the lower right-hand seat next to regular panelist Richard Dawson). Her acting credits include the original Broadway production of The Best Little Whorehouse in Texas (succeeding Carlin Glynn) and the following films: Some of My Best Friends Are..., Five Easy Pieces, Stay Hungry, Grease, and Crazy in Alabama, as well as minor roles in various television shows.

In 1975, she appeared as the Amazon Doctor in the pilot for The New Adventures of Wonder Woman. She is also known for being a regular on The New Dick Van Dyke Show, where for two seasons she played Mike Preston, sister to Van Dyke's character Dick Preston, and for her role as Cassie Bowman in all 30 episodes of the 1980-81 sitcom version of Harper Valley PTA starring Barbara Eden. She also appeared several times as a victim of alien abduction on the talk show parody Fernwood 2 Night in 1977. During the 1960s and 1970s, Flagg recorded two comedy albums with various skits that included many parodies of Lady Bird Johnson and Martha Mitchell.

Other TV appearances
In addition to her many game show appearances, Flagg has been a guest on several talk shows over the years, including The Joey Bishop Show, The Dick Cavett Show, The Merv Griffin Show, The Johnny Cash Show, Dinah!, and The Rosie O'Donnell Show. Flagg also appeared on Good Morning America to share some recipes from her book A Redbird Christmas.

Personal life
Flagg has spoken publicly about being dyslexic. She has expressed the great challenge of being a writer, saying, "I was, am, severely dyslexic and couldn't spell, still can't spell. So I was discouraged from writing and embarrassed." Even though it was clear that she had an affinity for crafting stories, her dyslexia stalled any possible writing career through most of the 1970s. It wasn't until a teacher spotted a pattern in Flagg's misspelled written answers on Match Game and sent her a note that she understood she had a learning disability. In fact, Flagg said she hadn't even heard of the disorder until she received that note. Eventually, Flagg was able to overcome her fear associated with the disorder and has since completed several novels.

In the mid-1970s, Flagg shared a house in Charlottesville, Virginia  with American writer Rita Mae Brown, whom she met at a party in the Hollywood Hills hosted by Marlo Thomas. According to Brown, Flagg also lived for eight years with former The Bold and the Beautiful actress Susan Flannery.

Filmography

Film

Television

Bibliography

Accolades

Awards and nominations

References

External links
 
 

1944 births
Living people
Actresses from Birmingham, Alabama
American film actresses
20th-century American novelists
American television actresses
American television personalities
American women television personalities
Ramsay High School alumni
Writers from Birmingham, Alabama
American women screenwriters
American women novelists
20th-century American women writers
21st-century American women writers
21st-century American novelists
Novelists from Alabama
Screenwriters from Alabama
Writers with dyslexia
American women comedians
Comedians from Alabama